Hector Hawton (7 February 1901 – 14 December 1975) was a British humanist, novelist and rationalist writer.

Biography

Hawton was born in Plymouth and was educated at Plymouth College. He married Mary Bishop, they had two sons. He worked as a journalist for the Western Morning News (1919–1923), National Press Agency (1923–1927) and was an editor for Empire News (1927–1929).

During World War II he worked for No. 4 Group RAF at Heslington Hall, Yorkshire. He was managing director of the Rationalist Press Association (1952–1971) and editor for The Humanist.

Hawton was sympathetic to the Christ myth theory. He wrote the introduction to the 1967 reprint of J. M. Robertson's book Pagan Christs. He ghostwrote many of the books attributed to Eustace Chesser.

Hawton authored many novels, including science fiction. Some of these were published under the pseudonyms Jack Lethaby or John Sylvester.

He identified as a Marxist but later moved away from this viewpoint. He has been described as "one of the most significant humanists in postwar Britain."

Publications

Nonfiction

Flight From Reality (1941)
Night Bombing (1944)
The Men Who Fly (1944)
Men Without Gods (1948)
Philosophy for Pleasure (1949)
Why be Moral?: How to Decide What is Right and What is Wrong Without Invoking a Supernatural Law-Giver (1947)
The Thinker's Handbook: A Guide to Religious Controversy (1950)
The Feast of Unreason (1952)
Reason in Action (1956) [with Archibald Robertson, J. B. Coates, Donald Ford and H. J. Blackham]
The Humanist Revolution (1963)
Controversy: The Humanist/Christian Encounter (1971)

Novels

 Murder Cave (1934)
Frozen Fire (1935)
Murder at H.Q. (1935)
Unnatural Causes (1947)
Murder by Mathematics (1948)
The Case of the Crazy Atom (1948)
Master of the World (1949) 
Tower of Darkness (1950)
Blue-Eyed Buddha (1951) 
Operation Superman (1951)
Black Emperor (1952) 
Death of a Witch (1952)
The Flying Saucer (1952)
The Lost Valley (1953)
Rope for the Judge (1954)
Skeleton in the Cupboard (1955)
The Green Scorpion (1957)

References

External links
Hector Hawton – Fantastic Fiction

1901 births
1975 deaths
Royal Air Force airmen
Military personnel from Plymouth, Devon
20th-century English novelists
Critics of Christianity
English atheists
English humanists
English male journalists
English sceptics
Freethought writers
Writers from Plymouth, Devon
Rationalists
Royal Air Force personnel of World War II
Authors of Sexton Blake